Jacob Moser (28 November 1839 – 1922) was a businessman, philanthropist and, later, councillor, who made his home in Bradford and became a leading participant in the civic life of the city.

Life 
Moser was of German Jewish descent and was born at Kappeln, Duchy of Schleswig, which was then part of Denmark. As a young man he spent some years in Hamburg and in Paris, and came to Bradford in 1863. During his first nine years there, he worked for firms such as W. Herels, Jonas Simonson and Co., and Hirsch, Pinner and Co. In 1872 he became a partner, and eventually the main figure, in the firm of Edelstein, Moser and Co., which developed into one of the great Bradford textile export houses.

Jacob Moser was a philanthropist, and it is estimated that throughout his life he gave £750,000 to various causes and charities. Alongside his work in his textile export business, Jacob was a founder of the Bradford Charity Organisation Society and the City Guild of Help. He was involved in founding Bradford Technical School in 1882.
He served on the board of the Infirmary from 1883 and gave £5000 to a fund to build a new hospital. In 1898 he provided £10,000 as a benevolent fund for the old and infirm of the city. He supported the local Children's Hospital and gave 12,000 books to Bradford Central Library.

He joined Bradford Council as an independent member for Manningham in 1896. He served Heaton from 1901 to 1904 and in 1909 was elected unopposed in the Little Horton ward. In 1910 Jacob Moser was Lord Mayor of Bradford and Chief Magistrate. Moser was a founder of the Bradford Reform Synagogue. He was also an advocate of the formation of the Jewish State of Israel.

The following tribute was paid by a Bradford newspaper to the memory of Jacob Moser, "He was a foreigner, but he made himself one of ourselves, he was of the Jewish persuasion, but his heart was big beyond all religion in the common cause of humanity".

References 

1839 births
1922 deaths
People from Schleswig-Flensburg
People from the Duchy of Schleswig
Danish emigrants to the United Kingdom
Danish Jews
Mayors of Bradford